Navarredonda de Gredos is a municipality located in the province of Ávila, Castile and León, Spain. According to the 2011 census (INE), the municipality had a population of 472 inhabitants.

Economy 
Navarredonda de Gredos used to be mainly a village depending on farming, but has become more oriented towards tourism. In addition to the Parador de Gredos, opened on 9 October 1928 as the very first Parador de Turismo, the village has various companies dedicated to activities for tourism, including horse riding excursions. Sierra de Gredos offers the possibility of skiing during the winter.

References 

Municipalities in the Province of Ávila